Beausoleil is a commune in the Alpes-Maritimes department in the Provence-Alpes-Côte d'Azur region in Southeastern France. It adjoins the Principality of Monaco to its south. The commune of Beausoleil was established in 1904; it was supposed to be named Monte-Carlo Supérieur for a time but the idea was abandoned after protests from Monégasque authorities. In 2017, it had a population of 13,607.

Geography

Located on a hillside above the city-state of Monaco, Beausoleil is surrounded by the Tête de Chien and Agel mountains. It is urbanistically contiguous with the principality and shares some streets, as the Boulevard de France, the Boulevard du Maréchal Leclerc, and the Avenue du Maréchal Foch. Its municipality borders with the Monégasque wards of Monte Carlo, Saint Roman, Saint Michel, Moneghetti and Les Révoires; and with the French municipalities of La Turbie, Roquebrune-Cap-Martin and Peille.

Economy
The commune is intertwined with Monaco. It functions to some extent as a bedroom community as many of its residents are employed in Monaco. The main part of the town consists of Belle Époque houses with ornate entrances.  Attractions within Beausoleil include the Gustave Eiffel covered market, St Joseph's Sanctuary (a church with ornate stained-glass windows) and the Fontdivina Fountain and Wash House.

Given the town's proximity to Monaco, real estate in Beausoleil is prohibitively expensive for many. There is a sense in which the even more expensive Monaco exports its worker accommodation challenge to Beausoleil, which, in turn, exports its own acute accommodation challenge to other French towns further inland.

Politics
The town's border with Monaco was largely fixed during the 18th century. What is now known as Beausoleil was administered from La Turbie prior to 1904, when the town was incorporated. Along with other French communes adjacent to Monaco, the electorate has traditionally had a sizable proportion which is left-leaning: Roger Bennati, mayor of the town 1989–1995, served under Communist affiliation. Monaco's political parties are more right-leaning.

Former mayors

Demographics

Beausoleil is the home of many Filipino and Portuguese immigrants.

Education
Schools in Beausoleil:
 Groupe Paul Doumer et Jean Jaurès (preschool/nursery and elementary school in two campuses)
 Groupe Les Cigales (preschool/nursery and elementary school)
 Groupe Les Copains (preschool/nursery and elementary school)
 École du Ténao (preschool/nursery and elementary school)
 Collège Bellevue (junior high school)

Transport
The Gare de Monaco-Monte-Carlo is located on the border between Beausoleil and Monaco.

See also
Communes of the Alpes-Maritimes department

References

External links

 Beausoleil official site
 Official Office of Tourism website

Communes of Alpes-Maritimes
France–Monaco border crossings
Alpes-Maritimes communes articles needing translation from French Wikipedia
Populated places established in 1904
1904 establishments in France